Kurin has two definitions: a military and administrative unit of the Zaporozhian Cossacks, Black Sea Cossack Host, and others; and of a type of housing (see below).

In the administrative definition, a kurin usually consisted of a few hundred Cossacks, with their own land, treasury and flag, and around a hundred houses. The number of kurins was not permanent, and varied throughout time: during the 16th century, there were 8 kurins in the Zaporozhian Sich and 38 during the first half of the 18th century. All Cossacks had to be part of a kurin and were listed on the so-called "kurin komput" (a register of Cossacks in the kurin), and were subject to the kurin otaman.

In the other definition, a kurin is a type of housing, sometimes temporary, which can vary in size and purpose: from a small tent made of leaves, to a large wooden house for permanent occupation.

Etymology 
Kurin is most probably a loanword of Turkic origins. Compare Chagatai kürän ("group of warriors") and Uyghur kürijän ("warrior wagon train"). Other etymologies have been proposed - most prominently from the word курити, which means to smoke, create smoke - but they are generally not supported by linguists.

In the Zaporozhian Sich 
According to Dmytro Yavornytsky in his book "History of the Zaporozhian Cossacks" (Ukrainian: Історія запорізьких козаків), a kurin was a barrack 31 metres in length and 4 metres in width which was built out of lumber, with varying internal structures, or a military unit around the size of a regiment. Each kurin would have a small treasury building where cossacks would store valuables. Most cossacks did not live in the kurin they were counted in, rather choosing nearby villages, wilderness or other. The kurin were usually named after nearby towns, the otaman which founded them, or from the original hometowns of the resident cossacks. 10 kurins constituted a quarter of the whole Sich, and would be classified as a "pirija" - a special administrative unit with its own treasury, which was larger than in the individual kurins.

References

Military of the Russian Empire
World War II resistance movements
Military units and formations of Ukraine
Cossack military units and formations
Ukrainian Insurgent Army